The Department of Militia and Defence was the department responsible for military land forces in Canada from 1906 to 1921.

The Minister of Militia and Defence was in charge of this department.

The department was created in 1906 when the British Army withdrew its forces stationed in Canada, and it remained in place to support the Permanent Active Militia and Non-Permanent Active Militia, the name for Canadian land forces.

In 1921 the Royal Canadian Navy was transferred to the Department of Militia and Defence from the Department of Marine and Fisheries and the Naval Service.  In the same year, the department was renamed the Department of Militia and Defence and the Naval Service.  In 1922 the name of the department was changed to the Department of National Defence with the merger of the Air Board.

Canadian Militia
Military history of Canada
Militia and Defence
1906 establishments in Canada
1921 disestablishments in Canada
Ministries established in 1906
Ministries disestablished in 1921